Pérez is a city in the . It is part of the Greater Rosario metropolitan area, and lies 175 km south of the provincial capital (Santa Fe). It has a population of about 26,000 inhabitants.

The town was founded in 1876 by Eduardo Pérez and María Pérez de Jolly. It became officially a commune (comuna) on 20 November 1905, and a city on 4 November 1971.

References
 
 

Servicio de Kinesiología y Fisioterapia: Lic. Germán Chiarella - Lic. Marina Perotti

Populated places in Santa Fe Province